The Leader of the National Party is the most-senior elected politician within the New Zealand National Party. Under the constitution of the party, they are required to be a member of the House of Representatives.

The current leader of the National Party since 30 November 2021 is Christopher Luxon.

Selection
Following a general election, or when a vacancy arises, the Parliamentary Section of the National Party (the Caucus) elects a Leader of the Parliamentary Section (that is, the parliamentary leader). After receiving approval by the Board of Directors (the governing body of the Party), the Leader of the Parliamentary Section becomes the Leader of the Party.

Role
The leader organises the business of the party in Parliament and represents the party to the general public. Within the party organisation, they must ensure political consensus; the constitution of the National Party states that the leader has "the right to attend any Party meeting or committee meeting and shall be an ex officio member of the Board".

When the National Party is in Government the leader generally becomes the prime minister. In 1949, party leader Sidney Holland became the first prime minister from the National Party.

List of leaders
Of the fifteen people to officially hold the leadership, eight have served as prime minister.

Key:

PM: Prime Minister
LO: Leader of the Opposition

See also
Deputy leader of the New Zealand National Party
Leader of the New Zealand Labour Party
List of political parties in New Zealand

Footnotes

References

New Zealand National Party
New Zealand politics-related lists
Political office-holders in New Zealand
New Zealand National Party